Amos Tutuola (20 June 1920 – 8 June 1997) was a Nigerian writer who wrote books based in part on Yoruba folk-tales.

Early history 
Amos Olatubosun Tutuola Odegbami was born on 20 June 1920, in Wasinmi, a village just a few miles outside of Abeokuta, Nigeria, where his parents, Charles Tutuola Odegbami and Esther Aina Odegbami, who were Yoruba Christian cocoa farmers, lived. Wasinmi was a small farming village founded between the years 1845 and 1880 by constituents of the Egba subethnic group from Abeokuta. Tutuola's father and grandfather belonged to this subethnic group.

Amos was the youngest son of his father; his mother was his father's third wife. His grandfather the Odafin of Egbaland, Chief Odegbami (c. 1842–1936), patriarch of the Odegbami clan, was a chieftain of the Egba people and a traditional worshipper of the Yoruba religion. His title, "Odafin" (literally "the establisher of laws" or "lawgiver" in Yoruba), signified that he had an administrative position within the traditional administration of Egbaland, and that he was one of the Iwarefa of the Ogboni.

When Amos was seven years old, in 1927, he became a servant for F. O. Monu, an Igbo man, who sent him to the Salvation Army primary school in lieu of wages. At age 12, he attended the Anglican Central School in Abeokuta. His brief education was limited to six years (from 1934 to 1939). After his grandfather's death in 1936, most members of the chief's family decided to adopt the European style of naming and take his name, Odegbami, as their last name. However, several other family members, including Amos, decided to take their father's name, Tutuola, instead. When his father died in 1939, Tutuola left school to train as a blacksmith, the trade he practised from 1942 to 1945 for the Royal Air Force in Nigeria during WWII. He subsequently tried a number of other vocations, including selling bread and acting as messenger for the Nigerian Department of Labour. In 1946, Tutuola completed his first full-length book, The Palm-Wine Drinkard, within two days. In 1947, he married Victoria Alake, with whom he had four sons and four daughters; he would also marry 3 other wives. He is the uncle of the Nigerian footballers Segun Odegbami and Wole Odegbami.

Writing 
Despite his short formal education, Tutuola wrote his novels in English. In 1956, after he had written his first three books and become internationally famous, he joined the Nigerian Broadcasting Corporation in Ibadan, Western Nigeria as a storekeeper. Tutuola also became one of the founders of the Mbari Club, the writers' and publishers' organization. In 1979, he held a visiting research fellowship at the University of Ife (now Obafemi Awolowo University) at Ile-Ife, Nigeria, and in 1983 he was an associate of the International Writing Program at the University of Iowa. In retirement he divided his time between residences Ibadan and Ago-Odo.

Tutuola died at the age of 76 on 8 June 1997 from hypertension and diabetes.

Many of his papers, letters, and holographic manuscripts have been collected at the Harry Ransom Humanities Research Center at the University of Texas, Austin.

Tutuola's works have been translated into 11 languages, including French, German, Russian, and Polish. Some translators, notably Raymond Queneau (French) and Ernestyna Skurjat (Polish), deliberately adjusted the grammar and syntax of the translations to reflect the occasionally atypical language of Tutuola's original prose.

The Palm Wine Drinkard
Tutuola's most famous novel, The Palm-Wine Drinkard and his Dead Palm-Wine Tapster in the Deads' Town, was written in 1946, first published in 1952 in London by Faber and Faber, then translated and published in Paris as L'Ivrogne dans la brousse by Raymond Queneau in 1953. Poet Dylan Thomas brought it to wide attention, calling it "brief, thronged, grisly and bewitching". Although the book was praised in England and the United States, it faced severe criticism in Tutuola's native Nigeria. Part of this criticism was due to his use of "broken English" and "primitive" style, which supposedly promoted the Western stereotype of "African backwardness". This line of criticism has, however, lost steam. In the opinion of Taban Lo Liyong:

Omolara Ogundipe-Leslie in her own reassessment wrote in The Journal of Commonwealth Studies:

O. R. Dathorne additionally said:

Wole Soyinka wrote in 1963:

The Palm-Wine Drinkard was followed by My Life in the Bush of Ghosts in 1954 and then several other books in which Tutuola continued to explore Yoruba traditions and folklore, although none of the subsequent works managed to match the success of The Palm Wine Drinkard. His 1958 work, The Brave African Huntress, was illustrated by Ben Enwonwu.

Selected bibliography
 The Palm-Wine Drinkard (1946, published 1952)
 My Life in the Bush of Ghosts (1954)
 Simbi and the Satyr of the Dark Jungle (1955)
 The Brave African Huntress (1958)
 Feather Woman of the Jungle (1962)
 Ajaiyi and his Inherited Poverty (1967)
 The Witch-Herbalist of the Remote Town (1981)
 The Wild Hunter in the Bush of the Ghosts (1982)
 Yoruba Folktales (1986)
 Pauper, Brawler and Slanderer (1987)
 The Village Witch Doctor and Other Stories (1990)

Tributes
Brian Eno and David Byrne named their 1981 album My Life in the Bush of Ghosts after Tutuola's second novel.

In 2015, the Society of Young Nigerian Writers, under the leadership of Wole Adedoyin, founded the Amos Tutuola Literary Society, aimed at promoting and reading Tutuola's works.

In 2021, Will Alexander published a long poem – 'Based on the Bush of Ghosts' – in honour of Tutuola. Refractive Africa, the collection of which this was part, was subsequently listed as a finalist for the Pulitzer Prize for Poetry.

References

Further reading 
 Collins, Harold R. Amos Tutuola. Twayne's World Author Series (TWAS 62). New York: Twayne Publishers, 1969.
 Lindfors, Bernth. "Amos Tutuola" in Twentieth Century Caribbean and Black African Writers. Dictionary of Literary Biography, Vol. 125. Detroit: Gale Research, 1983.
 Owomoyela, Oyekan. Amos Tutuola Revisited. Twayne's World Author Series (TWAS 880). New York: Twayne Publishers, 1999.

External links

 
 Amos Tutuola Collection at the Harry Ransom Center
 Amos Tutuola at The Imperial Archive
 Profile of Amos Tutuola  by Michael Swanwick

1920 births
1997 deaths
20th-century male writers
20th-century Nigerian novelists
Deaths from diabetes
English-language writers from Nigeria
International Writing Program alumni
Nigerian blacksmiths
Nigerian expatriates in the United States
Nigerian fantasy writers
Nigerian folklorists
Nigerian male novelists
Weird fiction writers
Writers from Abeokuta
Yoruba writers
Tutuola